is an anime produced by Sunrise to celebrate the 30th anniversary of the Gundam plastic model kits. It was directed by Kou Matsuo and written by Yousuke Kuroda, and features character designs by Kaichiro Terada. The show was originally broadcast on BS11 and streamed on the Internet from August 15, 2010 to December 19, 2010 with 3 15-minute episodes before being released on both DVD and Blu-ray on December 22, 2010. Unlike other Gundam titles, Gunpla Builders Beginning G takes place in a present-day timeline.

Aside from the anime, two manga sequels were released in Dengeki Hobby Magazine.

Story 
While attending the 1/1 RX-78-2 Gundam display event in Odaiba's Shiokaze Park, Haru Irei goes to the merchandise section to choose a Gunpla kit. When he fails to pick up the last available High Grade (HG) 1/144 RX-78-2 Gundam kit, he discovers the HG 1/144 GPB-X80 Beginning Gundam and makes it his own. With his newly assembled kit, Haru participates in Gunpla Battle, a virtual simulation game where players have their Gunpla models scanned and battle each other with them.

After his first encounter with the mysterious Boris Schauer and his HG 1/144 GPB-X38-30 Forever Gundam, Haru upgrades his Beginning Gundam before he and his friends Kenta Sakazaki and Rina Noyama enter the national Gunpla Battle tournament. The tournament ends with no clear winner, with Haru and Boris continuing to clash their beam sabers at each other. One year later, all of the main Gunpla kits of the series are on display at a hobby shop as Haru encourages younger kids to follow the same path he took.

Gunpla Battle 
In a Gunpla Battle, participants enter simulation cockpits that resemble the linear seats of later-Universal Century mobile suits. They place their Gunpla models in a scanning device that resembles a Haro unit. Oversized Haro units are also available to scan larger kits such as the 1/144 RX-78 GP03 Dendrobium. From there, they pilot their mobile suits in a simulated battlefield such as Tokyo or A Baoa Qu.

It is important to note that the mobile suit's statistics are relevant to the build quality of the Gunpla model. For example, a fully detailed Gunpla model with high quality paint and adhesive will perform better in a Gunpla Battle than one that is simply built straight out of the box. In addition, the scale of the Gunpla model is crucial in Gunpla Battle. For instance, a participant can pilot a Big Zam mobile armor, but if the Gunpla kit is 1/550 scale, then it is actually smaller in the battlefield than a 1/144 scale mobile suit.

Characters 

Haru Irei is a boy who becomes a "Gunpla Builder" after purchasing the GPB-X80 Beginning Gundam plastic model. His curiosity with the Gundam franchise leads him to participating in Gunpla Battle.

Kenta Sakazaki is Haru's friend who loves Gunpla and gives advice to Haru about building them. He also serves as Haru's wingman in Gunpla Battles.

Rina Noyama is a cheerful girl who is a big fan of Gunpla, yet seems to lack knowledge about the mobile suits they are based upon. She becomes Haru's second wingman in the final Gunpla Battle.

Boris Schauer is senior "Gunpla Meister" who challenges Haru with his GPB-X78-30 Forever Gundam. Sporting long, blond hair and wearing sunglasses, he resembles Quattro Bajeena.

Koji Matsumoto is a veteran Gunpla Builder and leader of the idol group  who challenges Haru to his first duel, with Haru's Beginning Gundam at stake.

Matsumoto's manager builds his Gunpla for him.

Tatsu Shimano is a Gunpla Builder who is assigned to mentor Haru and Kenta in Gunpla Battle strategy. Much like Allelujah Haptism of Mobile Suit Gundam 00, he develops a somewhat sadistic alter ego during battle.

Hinode Irei is Haru's father.

Urara Irei is Haru's mother.

Sam is Boris' wingman in the final Gunpla Battle. He pilots an RX-79BD-1 Blue Destiny Unit 1.

Diane Lee is Boris' female wingman. She pilots an MS-18E Kämpfer.

Mecha

Original units

The Beginning Gundam is Haru's first Gunpla bought at Shiokaze Park. A close-combat-type mobile suit equipped with nine beam-sabers, head-mounted beam vulcan cannons, a beam rifle and an asymmetrically designed shield. Haru uses three beam sabers at once in combat, which was not intended in the original design, as the kit would surpass the power of most of the normal Gunpla kits. On its first Gunpla Battle, the Beginning Gundam defeats Koji's custom Hi-ν Gundam, but is quickly challenged and defeated by the veteran master builder Boris Schauer and his Forever Gundam. Following this match, Haru works hard to rebuild and detail the Beginning Gundam to improve its performance.

The Beginning 30 Gundam is an upgraded version of the Beginning Gundam using an exclusive "IFS Unit" parts runner provided by Haru's father with some design output by Boris Schauer. The Gundam is now outfitted with extra armor and vernier boosters for increased performance and defense. The unit is also capable of using its beam sabers as bits and is armed with an I-Field generator.

Customized units

The Forever Gundam is Boris Schauer's customized Gunpla based on the 1/144 High Grade Version G30th (HG Ver.G30th) RX-78-2 Gundam, with additional armor and four detachable Variable Speed Beam Rifle (VSBR) funnels. As the chest armor covers the beam saber holders on the backpack, the beam sabers are mounted on the forearms.

The Hi-ν Gundam GPB Color is Koji's Gunpla that he uses to challenge Haru. Apparently a customized version of the 1/144 High Grade Universal Century (HGUC) RX-93-ν2 Hi-ν (Nu) Gundam with an original white and black color scheme. In animation production, three kits of Hi-ν Gundam were used in order to obtain three pairs of movable fin funnels (in the actual Gunpla, only one pair is movable). In episode one, the Hi-ν is defeated by the Beginning Gundam, as it was built by Koji's manager, who did not discover a weak polycap on its left hip. In episode 3, Koji rebuilds the kit by himself; however, it is defeated by the Beginning 30 in the A Baoa Qu stage of the Gunpla Battle tournament.

The Super Custom Zaku F2000 is Tatsu's customized, heavily armed Gunpla, based on the 1/144 HGUC MS-06F2 Zaku F2. It is colored purple and dark gray. Armament consists of a Deadend G Heat Hawk, Super Custom MMP-80 90mm Machine Gun and MMP-78 120mm Zaku Machine Gun, a forearm-mounted machine gun and shoulder-mounted missile launchers. In addition, the Zaku F2000 has two additional arms to hold all of its weaponry. The Zaku F2000 displays its lethal potential in episode 2 by heavily damaging Kenta's Byaku Shiki, but reveals its Achilles' heel when the poor-quality cement and putty used on the kit causes the armor parts to go brittle and crumble off the suit. This results in a swift defeat at the hands of Haru and his rebuilt Beginning Gundam. In episode 3, Tatsu rebuilds the kit with improved materials and is seen destroying an RX-78 GP03S Gundam Stamen in the A Baoa Qu stage.

The Beargguy is Rina's customized Gunpla, a modified 1/144 HGUC MSM-04 Acguy with a teddy bear head. Beargguy is a high-firepower mobile suit carrying with a recorder-like beam rifle and a missile launcher backpack designed to resemble a school satchel bag. Its bear eyes are actually mega-beam launchers - a play on the term "Beam Launcher from the eye", which can be pronounced the same in Japanese. (The HG model kit provides eye stickers with emotions as additional parts.) In episode 3, the Beargguy's mega-beam launchers nearly destroy Diane's Kämpfer.

Proto Beargguy
The Proto Beargguy is the original incarnation of Beargguy seen in episode 2. It still uses the original Acguy head and is seen wearing a bear-hat and holding a fish.

The Hyaku Shiki (GPB Color "Byaku Shiki") is Kenta's customized build of the 1/144 HGUC Hyaku Shiki with Mega Beam Launcher. Kenta painted it white and changed the original kit's "Hyaku" mark (百) to the kanji for white (白), calling it "Byaku Shiki" (白式). During its battle in episode 2, the Byaku Shiki loses its legs to an attack by Tatsu's Zaku F2000, but it manages to inflict damage on the Zaku F2000 firing its hyper bazooka at its chest armor.

The Sazabi GPB Color is Kenta's second Gunpla, an HGUC 1/144 MSN-04 Sazabi repainted in white. The Sazabi engages in battle with Sam's RX-79BD-1 Blue Destiny Unit 1 in episode 3.

Episodes 
Each episodes is marked as "Parts" after a parts runner of a Gunpla kit.

Music

Ending Song
"my Proud,my Play!"
Performed by: KAmiYU

KAmiYU is a portmanteau of voice actors Hiroshi Kamiya and Miyu Irino. It is also the Japanese pronunciation of Kamille Bidan of Mobile Suit Zeta Gundam.

Home media 
The three episodes were later compiled and released on both DVD and Blu-ray on December 22, 2010. Both versions include a 16-page liner note. The Blu-ray Collector's Edition includes an original CD featuring its theme "my Proud, my Play!", a sound drama, plus an original slipcase and special features such as audio commentary, music videos and Gunpla TV ads.

See also 
Gundam Build Fighters

References

External links 
Official Bandai Hobby site 

2010 anime OVAs
Gunpla Builders
Sunrise (company)
Metafictional television series